The  is a governmental agency that delivers the bulk of Official Development Assistance (ODA) for the government of Japan. It is chartered with assisting economic and social growth in developing countries, and the promotion of international cooperation. The OECD's Development Assistance Committee published a peer review of Japan's development co-operation in October 2020. It was led by Dr. Shinichi Kitaoka, the former President of the International University of Japan, from 2015 to 2022. On 1 April 2022, Professor Akihiko Tanaka assumed the presidency of the Japan International Cooperation Agency (JICA) as the successor to Professor Shinichi Kitaoka.

History
JICA's predecessor, the previous Japan International Cooperation Agency (also known as "JICA"), was a semi-governmental organization under the jurisdiction of the Ministry of Foreign Affairs, formed in 1974. The new JICA was formed on October 1, 2003. A major component of the comprehensive overhaul of Japan's ODA decided by the National Diet in November 2006, is that the merger in 2008 will be between JICA and that part of the Japan Bank for International Cooperation (JBIC) which currently extends concessional loans to developing countries.

Since its completion on 1 October 2008, the new JICA has become one of the largest bilateral development organizations in the world with a network of 97 overseas offices, projects in more than 150 countries, and available financial resources of approximately 1 trillion yen ($8.5 billion). The reorganized agency is also responsible for administering part of Japan's grant aid which is currently under the jurisdiction of the Ministry of Foreign Affairs and so all three major ODA components—technical cooperation, grant aid, and concessional loans—are now managed "under one roof." The new JICA will also strengthen research and training capacity in the years ahead, acting as a kind of ODA think tank, contributing to global development strategies, strengthening collaboration with international institutions, and being better able to communicate Japan's position on major development and aid issues. 

The forthcoming changes will be an extension of a series of JICA reforms which began in October 2003 when it became administratively independent. The organization's domestic establishments including international centers where JICA helps train some 8,000 foreign public officials, researchers, engineers, instructors and community leaders annually in Japan are being streamlined. The organization is also undergoing operational and organizational change in its country offices. Greater emphasis is being placed on a field-based approach to programs/projects, decentralizing staff, and delegating increased authority from Tokyo headquarters to overseas offices, reducing bureaucracy, and fast tracking programs/projects.

An increasing number of JICA programs/projects focus on what JICA's former President, Mrs. Sadako Ogata describes as providing "human security". The recently developed concept of "human security" will empower local communities to have a greater say in their own futures by strengthening grassroots programs, such as improving education and health projects.

Timeline
 1954 Apr - Japan joins Colombo Plan and initiates technical cooperation programs
 1962 Jun - Overseas Technology Cooperation Agency (OTCA) established
 1963 Jul - Japan Emigration Service (JEMIS) established
 1965 Apr - Japan Overseas Cooperation Volunteers (JOCV) program launched
 1974 Aug - OTCA and JEMIS merge to form the Japan International Cooperation Agency (JICA)
 1987 Sep - Disaster Relief Team formed
 1989 - Total official development assistance (ODA) contributions exceed that of the United States to become the highest in the world
 1990 Apr - Senior Cooperation Specialist (Senior Overseas Volunteer) dispatch program begun
 2003 Oct - JICA established as an Independent Administrative Institution

Presidents 

JICA's current and former presidents:
 since April 2022: Akihiko Tanaka
 2015-2022: Shinichi Kitaoka
 2012–2015: Akihiko Tanaka
 2003–2012: Sadako Ogata

Activities
JICA is part of Japan's official development assistance effort, with a role in providing technical cooperation, capital grants and yen loans. According to the OECD, 2020 official development assistance from Japan increased 1.2% to USD 16.3 billion. JICA's core development programs (aid modalities) are technical assistance programs/projects for capacity and institutional development, feasibility studies and master plans. The Japan Overseas Cooperation Volunteers (JOCV), JICA Senior Volunteers, and Japan Disaster Relief Team groups of JICA are widely known among the Japanese general public and tax-payers. Japan Disaster Relief Team members are often seen in news reports on relief efforts after major natural disasters around the world, such as the 2005 South Asian earthquake.

JICA's Mission Statement:

"We, as a bridge between the people of Japan and developing countries, will advance international cooperation through the sharing of knowledge and experience and will work to build a more peaceful and prosperous world."

Major aid modalities
Technical assistance programs/projects for capacity and institutional development
Feasibility studies and master plans
Dispatch of Specialists

Specialists dispatched to the field include those recommended from related government ministries and agencies as well as those applying through the specialist registration system. Assignments range from extended stays of over a year to shorter stays of less than one year.

Technical training program
JICA provides technical training for participants from the developing countries in a wide range of fields, including medical, industrial, and agricultural training.
 Training within Japan
 Group training
 Field-specific course (Course aimed at deepening understanding of worldwide issues in various fields. Courses are generally between four and 15 people, 10 on average. Course length varies from three weeks to one year.)
 Country/Region-specific course (Course aimed at deepening understanding of issues specific to a country or region)
 Individual training (Generally technical training specific to a project)
 Accommodation
JICA has its own accommodation facilities for participants of many of its programs. They are located in the important cities in Japan and are generally referred to as International Centers. The one at Tokyo is Tokyo International Center situated in Hatagaya, Shibuya. The facilities are of good quality and details are available in the JICA website.

Volunteer dispatch
 Japan (Youth) Overseas Cooperation Volunteers (JOCV)
 Senior Overseas Volunteers
 Nikkei Society Youth Volunteers
 Nikkei Society Senior Volunteers

See also
 Development aid
 Japan Foundation
 Peace Corps
 Koyamada International Foundation
 JICA research Institute
 SATREPS

References

External links
  JICA official website in English
  JICA official website in Japanese
 Japan Ministry of Foreign Affairs ODA webpage
  JICA Japan Overseas Migration Museum website

 

 
International development agencies
International Cooperation Agency
International Cooperation Agency
Government agencies established in 2003
2003 establishments in Japan